Phi II or Phi 2 is a residential locality in south-western Greater Noida, Uttar Pradesh, India. Bordered by Omega I to the north, Phi I to the west and Swarn Nagari to the east, it is known to be one of the real estate hotspots of Greater Noida, alongside Omega II, Omega I, Phi I, Phi III, Phi IV, Chi I, Chi II, Chi III, Chi IV and Chi V. It is named after the Greek letter Phi.

References 

Geography of Uttar Pradesh